Patrick Langlois (born 28 October 1999) is an American-Australian professional footballer who plays for South Melbourne  as an attacking midfielder.

Club career

Newcastle Jets 

On 20 April 2019, Langlois made his first appearance coming on as a substitute in a 6–1 win over Brisbane Roar.

Career statistics

References

External links
 Patrick Langlois at Soccerway

1999 births
Living people
Newcastle Jets FC players
A-League Men players
National Premier Leagues players
Association football defenders
Australian soccer players